Luciana Castellari (born 12 August 1943 in Cesena) is an Italian former sprinter (100 m) and hurler (80 m hs).

Biography
In her career she won 1 time the national championships. She has 5 caps in national team from 1961 to 1965. She was in Italy national relay team and in the same club (Fontana C.B.), with her compration Donata Govoni from Bologna.

National titles
1 win in 4x100 metres relay at the Italian Athletics Championships (1965)

See also
Donata Govoni

References

External links
  La vostra Bologna del Novecento

1943 births
People from Rieti
Italian female sprinters
Living people
Sportspeople from the Province of Rieti
20th-century Italian women
21st-century Italian women